"All at Once" is a song by American singer Whitney Houston from her self-titled debut album and was released as a single in several European countries as well as in Japan in 1985–1986. It was not released as a single in North America, but did receive steady radio airplay on Pop and R&B/soul stations there. It is a ballad about a love who leaves without warning and the heartbreak that is felt afterwards. It is written by Michael Masser and Jeffrey Osborne.

Music videos
Arista released a promotional music video exclusive to Germany and Japan. Another video was released for some European countries. It features Houston singing the song onstage.

Chart performance
It became the first hit for Whitney Houston in the Netherlands in April 1985, and also a Top 5 hit on Italy and Belgium singles chart.

Live performances
Whitney performed the song on Dutch TV's PopsJops show, German TV's Peter's Popshow in 1985, and Japan TV Show Night's Hit Studio in 1986. The following year, Houston performed the song at the 1987 American Music Awards as well as Italy's Sanremo Music Festival. In this latter competition an encore of the song was requested, and Houston is the first and, so far, only singer to get it. Whitney also performed the song in Japan and Europe during her Greatest Love Tour in 1986.

Track listing and formats 

Europe 12" Vinyl Maxi-Single
A1 "All at Once" — 4:26 	
B1 "Thinking About You" — 4:53 	
B2 "Someone for Me" — 7:23 	Jamaica 7" Vinyl Maxi-SingleA1 "All at Once" — 4:28   	   	
B1 "Greatest Love of All" — 4:55 		Italy 12" Vinyl, PromoA "All at Once" — 4:26   	   	
B "Hold Me"  — 6:00		Japan 7" Vinyl, Single
A "All at Once" — 5:56 	
B "Greatest Love of All" — 6:16 	
Germany 7" Vinyl
"All at Once" — 4:06
"Thinking About You" — 4:44
South Africa 7" Vinyl Single
"All at Once"
"Thinking About You"

Charts

Weekly charts

Year-end charts

Certifications

References

External links
 

Whitney Houston songs
1980s ballads
1985 singles
1986 singles
Arista Records singles
1984 songs
Contemporary R&B ballads
Pop ballads
Songs written by Michael Masser
Songs written by Jeffrey Osborne
Songs about heartache